
t Schulten Hues is a restaurant  in Zutphen, Netherlands. It is a fine dining restaurant that was awarded one Michelin star for the period 2005-present.

GaultMillau awarded the restaurant 16 out of 20 points.

Head chef of t Schulten Hues is Peter Gast. 

Gast and his wife  Jacqueline van Liere opened the restaurant in September 2002. Originally, the restaurant was located on the Houtmarkt, but moved to a bigger location at 's-Gravenhof in 2007.

Book
In 2010, t Schulten Hues presented a book named "Portfolio XL" in a rather exceptional size: 0.5 meter x 0.7 meter.

See also

List of Michelin starred restaurants in the Netherlands

References 

Restaurants in the Netherlands
Michelin Guide starred restaurants in the Netherlands
Restaurants in Gelderland
Zutphen